Foster's Mound (22 AD 503) is a Plaquemine culture archaeological site located in Adams County, Mississippi northeast of Natchez off US 61. It is the type site for the Foster Phase (1350-1500 CE) of the Natchez Bluffs Plaquemine culture chronology. It was added to the NRHP on September 2, 1982 as NRIS number 82003091. The mounds are listed on the Mississippi Mound Trail.

Description
The Foster's site has two platform mounds and is located on the northern bank of St. Catherine Creek near its confluence with the Mississippi River. Its dimensions were originally smaller but it was enlarged to accommodate the veranda of the plantation house. It has been seriously eroded by the creek and is barely recognizable as a rectangular platform mound. The site sat at a major crossroads in Precolumbian times, because of its location on the original route of the Natchez Trace, directly connected to Emerald Mound to the northeast and the Grand Village of the Natchez to the southwest, and its proximity to the Mississippi River. The site was excavated in 1971-72 by Jeffrey P. Brain as part of the Lower Mississippi Survey for the Peabody Museum of Archaeology and Ethnology of Harvard University. Pottery recovered from beneath the mounds was found to be proto-Natchezan and was instrumental in defining the protohistoric Foster Phase (1350 to 1500 CE) of the Plaquemine culture chronology.

References

External links
 UM Museum of Anthropology

Natchez
Plaquemine Mississippian culture
Mounds in Mississippi
Geography of Adams County, Mississippi
Natchez Trace
National Register of Historic Places in Adams County, Mississippi
Archaeological sites on the National Register of Historic Places in Mississippi